Betatorquevirus is a genus of viruses in the family Anelloviridae, in group II in the Baltimore classification. The genus Betatorquevirus includes all "torque teno mini viruses" (TTMV), numbered from 1 to 38 as 38 species.

Taxonomy
The genus contains the following species:

Torque teno mini virus 1
Torque teno mini virus 2
Torque teno mini virus 3
Torque teno mini virus 4
Torque teno mini virus 5
Torque teno mini virus 6
Torque teno mini virus 7
Torque teno mini virus 8
Torque teno mini virus 9
Torque teno mini virus 10
Torque teno mini virus 11
Torque teno mini virus 12
Torque teno mini virus 13
Torque teno mini virus 14
Torque teno mini virus 15
Torque teno mini virus 16
Torque teno mini virus 17
Torque teno mini virus 18
Torque teno mini virus 19
Torque teno mini virus 20
Torque teno mini virus 21
Torque teno mini virus 22
Torque teno mini virus 23
Torque teno mini virus 24
Torque teno mini virus 25
Torque teno mini virus 26
Torque teno mini virus 27
Torque teno mini virus 28
Torque teno mini virus 29
Torque teno mini virus 30
Torque teno mini virus 31
Torque teno mini virus 32
Torque teno mini virus 33
Torque teno mini virus 34
Torque teno mini virus 35
Torque teno mini virus 36
Torque teno mini virus 37
Torque teno mini virus 38

Initial discovery
The discovery of TTMV, like the original Torque Teno virus (TTV) isolate, was accidental. After TTV was isolated in 1997 from a Japanese patient, primers were created to study TTV in more detail. TTV-specific primers used in PCR of human plasma samples yielded sequences that partially matched that of TTV, but were noticeably shorter. TTV was eventually understood to have a genome of 3.6–3.9 kb, while TTMV has a genome of 2.8–2.9 kb. Another TT-like virus later isolated in 2007, Torque teno midi virus or TTMDV, has a genome of 3.2 kb.

Genome and capsid
TTMV shares similar morphologic features with the other human anelloviruses. The capsid has a T=1 icosahedral symmetry. The virion does not have a lipid envelope and is thus "naked", making it an extremely simple virus. It is estimated that the virion is a little less than 30 nm in diameter.

The genome is circular and made of single-stranded DNA of negative polarity. It is 2.86–2.91 kilobases long. Anelloviruses are known for having 3 or 4 overlapping, nested open reading frames; TTMV has 3 ORF's that overlap. ORF-2 and ORF-3 overlap with ORF-1 at opposite ends. For TTMV, ORF-1 is about 663 residues and ORF-2 is about 91 residues long. There is a highly conserved 130-nt region just downstream of the TATA box.

Phylogeny & spread
TTMV is highly divergent. The first phylogenetic tree created from TTMV genomic sequences revealed a large cluster of strains; ORF-1 had divergences of over 42% at the nucleotide level and over 67% at the amino acid level.

TTMV is also highly prevalent, like other human anelloviruses. Subsequent research after it was discovered has yielded the prevalence of TTMV DNA among blood donors to be 48%–72%. It can likely infect a wide range of tissues, as it has been isolated from various body fluids and tissues, including saliva, feces, plasma/serum, PBMCs, bone marrow, spleen, pancreas, kidneys, nervous tissue, lymph nodes, semen, and cervical swabs. Its exact transmission mechanism is unknown, but is thought to be possible by blood-borne, sexual, fecal-oral, and respiratory routes.

Recent studies have shown that humans can have multiple infections of TT viruses.

Clinical
Though TTVs are potentially associated with dieases and their pathogenicity has been debated since their discovery, TTMV is not currently known as an explicit cause of any human disease. TTMV has been isolated from a number of parapneumonic empyema. However, its clinical significance remains unclear.

References

External links
 ICTV Virus Taxonomy 2009
 UniProt Taxonomy
 
 ICTVdb
 ViralZone: Betatorquevirus

Anelloviridae
Virus genera